C. Venkata S. Ram is an Indian doctor who is an expert in the treatment of high blood pressure. He is the director of blood pressure clinics and institute for blood pressure management at Apollo Hospitals, and Apollo Medical College, Hyderabad, India. He is also the director of World Hypertension League South Asia region and Dean, Macquarie University, Medical School, India campus, Hyderabad, India. He is a professor of medicine/clinical at the University of Texas Southwestern Medical School, Dallas, USA. He has authored 360 papers and 4 books, all in hypertension.

Education and  career
Ram attended  St.Paul high school,  Nizam college and Osmania medical college, all in Hyderabad, India. Subsequently, he underwent additional post graduate training at Brown University, Providence, USA, and at the University of Pennsylvania, USA; served on the faculty of University of Texas Southwestern Medical Center, and Director of Hypertension Clinics, Parkland Memorial Hospital, Dallas, USA for more than 3 decades where he did considerable clinical and research work in addition to teaching undergraduate and post-graduate medical students.
He served as the President of St.Paul University hospital, Dallas, USA, director of hypertension clinics at Parkland hospital/University of Texas, Southwestern Medical Center, Dallas, USA. He was the President of the Texas Indo-American Physicians Society and the American Association of Physicians from India. Also, was elected as the chairman of the board of governors, American Society of Hypertension and director, American Society of Hypertension and Specialists. Now on the executive committee of the World Hypertension League, and on the executive committee, faculty of medicine health sciences, Macquarie University, Sydney, Australia.

Personal life
Ram is married to Ashalata. They have two daughters.

Awards

Received several awards including “PADMASHRI” from the government of India, the outstanding alumnus award from Osmania Medical College graduates’ alumni association. He was given the outstanding doctor award by the AP hospitals/nursing homes association and Telangana hospitals/nursing homes association. On the doctors’ day (2015), he was bestowed the best doctor award by the University of Hyderabad. Received numerous recognitions from the Cardiological Society of India, Indian Society of Hypertension, and Association of Physicians of India.

In U.S., he was given the awards (best clinician teacher) by the St.Paul University hospital, Dallas, Texas. American Society of Hypertension bestowed on him Life Time Achievement award (The Moser award).

Books
 Ram CVS. Hypertension: A Clinical guide. CRC Press/Taylor and Francis group, Boca Raton, London, and New York, 2014.
 Ram CVS. Hypertension and Cardiovascular Disease: Current and Emerging Concepts. Euromed Communications passfield, U.K, 2014.
 Ram CVS. Hypertension and Clinical Cardiology; Euromed Communications, passfield, U.K, 2013.
 Ram CVS, Kaplan NM. Individualized Therapy of Hypertension. Marcel Dekker, Inc. New York, Basel, Hong Kong, 1995.

See also

 List of Padma Shri award recipients (2010–2019)

References

Living people
20th-century Indian medical doctors
Recipients of the Padma Shri in medicine
Year of birth missing (living people)